The 24 October Movement was a resistance movement, now a political party founded by Farouk El Moukaddem in 1969. The movement focuses on people from the lower classes who struggle through poverty.

Bibliography

1999 establishments in Lebanon
Social democratic parties
Factions in the Lebanese Civil War
Lebanese National Movement
Political parties established in 2002
Political parties in Lebanon
Social democratic parties in Lebanon